Chatakonda is a census town in Khammam district  in the state of telangana, India.

Geography
It has an average elevation of 70 metres (229 feet).

Demographics
 India census, Chatakonda had a population of 8701. Males constitute 50% of the population and females 50%. Chatakonda has an average literacy rate of 55%, lower than the national average of 59.5%; with male literacy of 62% and female literacy of 48%. 13% of the population is under age six.

References

Cities and towns in Khammam district